Captain Simian & the Space Monkeys is an American science-fiction-comedy animated television series. The show premiered in August 1996 in the United Kingdom and September 7, 1996, in the United States, and ended after 26 episodes on June 21, 1997. It was produced by Hallmark Entertainment,  Monkeyshine Productions, Inc., and distributed by Bohbot Entertainment and aired as part of the company's Amazin' Adventures syndicated animation block, later known as the Bohbot Kids Network.

Summary
During the monkey-manned spaceflights of the 1960s, one rocket veered off course, sending a chimp named Charles off into the outer reaches of space. After many years, Charles' craft was discovered by the most intelligent race in the universe; a running gag involves them being so advanced their name is unpronounceable, the characters mistake references to them as empty pauses.

Charles was given enhanced intelligence, weapons, and futuristic technology, along with a charge to protect the universe from the evil Lord Nebula. One of the more unusual villains in cartoon history, Nebula was a half-human, half-black hole who hoped to become a complete black hole, swallow the universe in a "Big Crunch," then remake it in his own image. His one problem was that, being half human, he was still susceptible to human ailments, such as the common cold and stomach aches.

To aid Charles (who was given the title "Captain Charles Simian"), The " " allowed him to recruit a team of fellow Earth monkeys and apes: Shao Lin, a Chinese golden monkey with swift fighting skills and serene wisdom; Spydor, a wisecracking little spider monkey with a long prehensile tail; Dr. Splitz/Splitzy, an orangutan with a scientist/madman split-personality; and Gor-illa/Gor, a big, strong gorilla who wrecked the intelligence-enhancing machine before he got a full helping.

The group cruised the stars in their ship, the Primate Avenger, battling Nebula and his cyborg monkey henchman, Rhesus 2, and searching for the ever-elusive bananas. The monkeys mixed fast-talking humor with fast-paced action.

Characters

Heroes
Captain Charles "Chuck" Simian: Originally a chimpanzee named Charles, sent into space in the 1960s by NASA. After drifting off course and being frozen for many years, he was discovered by The "       ". They believed he was sent by Earth as the most advanced species of the planet. When they realized he was not, they used a machine to evolve Charles into a sentient being. After being told about Nebula, Captain Simian (as he now called himself) recruited a team of fellow Earth monkeys and apes to help him save the universe.
Spydor: A wisecracking little spider monkey, originally the property of an organ grinder from New York City. A pickpocket, grifter, and all-around thief, he often tries to take advantage of Gor by trying to get him to do his work and trying numerous get-rich-quick schemes which get him into trouble with the Captain. Despite these flaws, Spydor is loyal to the mission, and will never betray his friends or the universe for money. He is especially close to Gor, and will not let anyone else take advantage of him. Spydor is in charge of communications.
Shao Lin: A Golden snub-nosed monkey, who originally lived at a Buddhist temple where she was worshiped as a goddess. She continues to act as a goddess with the rest of the crew even, on occasion, addressing herself in the Royal "we". This leads to considerable tension at first, though over time she warms to the others and vice versa. Skilled in martial arts and knowledgeable in Buddhist wisdom, she is Captain Simian's first officer. There are occasional hints of a romantic attraction between her and the Captain, though this was never developed.
Gor-illa/Gor: A gorilla originally from Rwanda as a dominant male and the crew's muscle. During the evolution process he accidentally wrecked the intelligence-enhancing machine before its completion. This left Gor rather naive and childlike. Possessing extraordinary strength, Gor is naturally quite peaceful and does not wish to do anyone harm. But when his friends are in danger he can go into a berserk rage. In an early episode Apax (below) kidnapped Gor to make him a prize fighter, but since Gor's peaceful nature did not permit him to fight needlessly, Apax experimented on him, turning him into a mindless, raging gigantic King Kong-like gorilla named Gormongous. Dr. Splitz was unable to reverse the effect of Apax's isotope, meaning that Gor turns into Gormongous whenever he gets angry, in a manner similar to that of the Incredible Hulk.
Dr. Splitz/Splitzy: A former zoo orangutan with a dual personality that alternates between an effete academic ("Dr. Splitz") and a rustic yokel ("Splitzy"). The doctor excels at scientific theory and somewhat cowardly, while Splitzy is a mechanic and engineer eager to jump into a fight. The two personalities are aware of each other and bicker constantly, but often rely on each other to make up for their individual shortcomings.
Orbitron: A small ball-shaped robot, given to Charles by The "       " to help him on his mission. Its role was to provide the monkeys with the additional knowledge they required for their journey. Already quite cynical and unpleasant, it was accidentally damaged by Gor and subsequently went quite insane, floating around sputtering nonsense that only occasionally makes sense. This leads Captain Simian to often say, "Gotta get that thing fixed."  Because it is so technologically advanced Splitzy was unable to repair it despite trying.

Villains

Lord Nebula (Voiced by Michael Dorn): Nebula is a half-humanoid, half-black hole who hoped to become a complete black hole, swallow the universe in a “Big Crunch,” then remake it in his own image. The gaseous nature of nebulae is employed as a running gag, as Nebula seems to constantly suffer from some cosmic analogue of gastro-intestinal distress. In the series finale he is trapped in an orb and Rhesus 2 takes over
Rhesus 2 (Voiced by Malcolm McDowell): An enforcer of Lord Nebula. Originally a rhesus monkey sent into space, Nebula made him intelligent and turned him into a cyborg. His brain is detachable and frequently changes from one to another in order to get different ideas. For example, Brain 1 might give him a more devious plan than Brain 2 or vice versa.
Apax (Voiced by Frank Welker): An alien with green skin and snakes in place of hair. Apax forces other alien creatures to fight in an arena. At one point, he injects an isotope into Gor, causing him to turn into a monster whenever he gets angry. He often says "Only in Andromeda!".
Kaz-Par (Voiced by Maurice Lamarche): An owner of a club on Maltese 1, who simply planned to steal the Primate Avenger, but had to go under the identity of Gorr when someone else replaced him to steal the Orbitron and sell it to Nebula, as Orbitron keeps repeating "0-1-0-0-1-0-0-1-0-1... oh, and 0-1.", which was the formula for the GLOP (Gravi-Luminous Orbifolding Positrons), which had the component needed by Nebula, the Anti-Force.

Other
Matrix: A computer that captures the Monkeys and learns from them to eventually evolve into a living being. Initially appears in episode Repo Ape.
Vog: Vog is a 2-dimensional alien. When Rhesus 2 steals gravitons from a cosmic storm, Vog's world rips open, so he follows Charles to his universe and asks his help to put the gravitons back before the cosmic storm ends to seal the rip and save his universe. Appeared in episode Monkey in the Middle.
Holo Boons: Holographic baboons created by Dr. Splitz to test out the atmosphere of unknown planets. They are voiced by Jeff Bennett, with a number of celebrity impressions (such as Beavis and Butt-head, Jerry Lewis, Woody Allen and The Three Stooges). They are a parody of the redshirts from the original Star Trek series, and almost always get destroyed.
Grixilpix: Keeper of the Great Ear. This ear is the one of the Sleeping Giant, whom Grxilpix tells the monkeys is dreaming about the whole universe. Anything that someone asks for to the ear appears. Rhesus attacks Captain Simian and his crew next to the ear, and in their fight, they awake the giant, causing the universe to disappear. Dr. Splitz then plays a lullaby on a handheld device, causing the giant to return to his slumber and the universe to be restored.
Largo Trix: A swashbuckling space adventurer who meets the crew in a bar in the episode "Monkey Puzzle Man".  Initially appearing as a blue-skinned humanoid, Largo gradually turns into a monkey-like creature as he hangs out with the crew, since he can duplicate another's most distinctive characteristic (martial arts skills from Shao Lin, who he flirts with, for example) after making physical contact.  Everyone likes him except Simian (who insists there's something weird about Largo) and Gor (who resents Spydor spending more time with Largo then him), but are dismissed as jealous.  Largo invites the crew back to his 'home', but it turns out to actually belong to Rhesus 2, whom Largo is working for.  After making contact with Captain Simian, however, Largo realizes the error of his ways and helps the monkeys escape, apparently sacrificing himself to give them time to get away.  However, it turns out at the end he managed to escape and leaves aboard a separate ship.
The "   ": An advanced alien race that is so advanced, the name of their species cannot be spoken or written, only thought. They intercepted Captain Simian while he was still a wild chimpanzee. Believed to be a human broken free of his evolutionary bonds, they gave Simian "The Gift", which is advanced intelligence and the power of speech. They assigned Simian to stop Nebula before he gets the anti-force and completes his dark goal which is to destroy the universe and create a new one within himself. During the series, The "   " retreated to the 10th dimension until part one of the series finale, where they warn Simian that Nebula is getting very close to his goal.
Mandrax: A being of infinite powers, who appears to be a mandrill able to float in space and midair, go through walls, be invulnerable to attacks, and be able to connect with others' minds. He speaks in ominous and cryptical phrases and seems to know everyone in the crew better than they know themselves. The last image of the series is the revelation of him being Captain Simian from the future. Voiced by David Carradine.

Episodes

Production and personnel

Production company
(Epoch Ink Animation/Toon-Us-In Animation)
Executive Producers (Rob Hudnut, Gorden Bressack, Gary Hartle)
Producer (Joe Pearson)
Directors (Brad Rader, David Schwartz, Joe Pearson, John Fox)
Art Director (Joe Pearson)
Design (Brad Coombs, Harry Warner, Gregg Davidson, Sung Woo Hong, Mike Smith, Mac Spada and Young Yoon Gi)
Storyboard (John Fox, Vincent Edwards, Jennifer Graves, Dave Chylstek, Dave Simmons, Mike Hedrick, Adam Van Wyk, Tom Nelson, David Bullock, Lyndon Ruddy, Mike Docherty, Young Yoon Gi, Robert Souza, Keith Tucker, Chuck Droost)

Voice actors
 Jerry Doyle - Captain Simian
 Karen Maruyama - Shao Lin
 Maurice LaMarche - Dr. Splitz/Splitzy
 Dom Irrera - Spydor
 James L. Avery, Sr. - Gor-illa/Gor
 Jeff Bennett - Orbitron
 Michael Dorn - Lord Nebula
 Malcolm McDowell - Rhesus 2

Crew
Directors: Brad Rader and David Schwartz
Designers: Brad Coombs, Harry Warner, Gregg Davidson, Sung Woo Hong, Mike Smith, Mac Spada and Young Yoon Gi
Storyboard artists: John Fox, Vincent Edwards, Jennifer Graves, Dave Chylstek, Dave Simmons, Mike Hedrick, Adam Van Wyk, Tom Nelson, David Bullock, Lyndon Ruddy, Mike Docherty, Young Yoon Gi, Robert Souza, Keith Tucker, Chuck Droost and Graham Morris (animation timing).

Studios
Epoch and Toon-Us-In provided all pre-production in L.A., including layout. 
Animation, ink and paint and camera was provided by Sun Min Image Pictures and Jireh Animation, two Seoul-based studios. 
Post house, Vitello Productions provided strong post-production services.

Action figures
In 1996, Mattel released a collection of action figures based on Captain Simian & the Space Monkeys. Designed by Bluebird Toys of the UK, the line included 9 basic figures and 4 large vehicles or accessories. The figures, armed with several accessories, were unusually packaged so that the consumer could rotate them inside the card bubble as though they were floating in space.

In other languages

References

External links

 Official Website (via Internet Archive)
 Ron "Keeper" O'Dell's Captain Simian & the Space Monkeys Site
 
 Splitzy's Planet of Space Monkeys

1990s American animated television series
1990s American comic science fiction television series
1996 American television series debuts
1997 American television series endings
American children's animated comic science fiction television series
American children's animated space adventure television series
Animated television series about monkeys
Animated television series about apes
Fictional military captains
Fictional astronauts
Animal superheroes
First-run syndicated television programs in the United States
Mattel
Action figures
1990s toys
English-language television shows
Anime-influenced Western animated television series
Television series by Mattel Creations
Television series set on fictional planets